Fraternity prank  may refer to:
 Hazing, various initiation rituals and other activities
 Practical joke, a mischievous trick played on a person